Narayan Patel is a Member of Legislative assembly from Unjha constituency in Gujarat for its 12th legislative assembly.

References

Living people
Bharatiya Janata Party politicians from Gujarat
Gujarat MLAs 2007–2012
Gujarat MLAs 2012–2017
Year of birth missing (living people)